Rosana Itatí Gómez (born 13 July 1980) is an Argentine football manager and former player and former futsal player. She manages the Bolivia women's national team. She played as a midfielder for the Argentina women's national team.

Club career
Gómez played for Rosario Central and Boca Juniors in Argentina.

International career
Gómez capped for Argentina at senior level during two Copa America Femenina editions (2003 and 2006) and two FIFA Women's World Cup editions (2003 and 2007).

Managerial career
Gómez managed the women's teams of UBA, Rosario Central and Social Lux in Argentina and the Argentina women's national team at the 2017 Summer Universiade.

References

1980 births
Living people
Sportspeople from Santa Fe Province
Argentine women's footballers
Women's association football midfielders
Rosario Central (women) players
Boca Juniors (women) footballers
Argentina women's international footballers
2003 FIFA Women's World Cup players
2007 FIFA Women's World Cup players
Footballers at the 2003 Pan American Games
Footballers at the 2007 Pan American Games
Pan American Games competitors for Argentina
Argentine football managers
Female association football managers
Women's association football managers
University of Buenos Aires alumni
Rosario Central managers
Argentina women's national football team managers
Argentine expatriate football managers
Argentine expatriate sportspeople in Bolivia
Expatriate football managers in Bolivia
Bolivia women's national football team managers